Qur'anic studies is the academic study of the Quran, the religious scripture of Islam.

Schools
Behnam Sadeghi and Mohsen Goudarzi classify scholars of Quranic studies into four groups: traditionalists, revisionists, skeptics, and neo-traditionalists. Most premodern scholars belong to the traditionalist group. According to Sadeghi and Goudarzi, the traditional account: 

The traditional account "continues to be fairly popular among the specialists in the Muslim world". European and American scholars, however, do not often agree with this account. This is because there is a "prevailing distrust in the literary sources on which it is founded". Sadeghi and Goudarzi categorize the majority of modern Euro American scholars into two main groups. The revisionist group rejects the traditional account as wrong. They dispute the idea that Uthman sought to correct the text, or they believe that important modifications in the standard text continued after Uthman, or, in the instance of scholars such as Wansbrough, they believe it is perhaps "anachronistic" to talk of the Quran during the time of Uthman, because the text came into being much later. Among the notable revisionists are John Wansbrough, Patricia Crone, Alfred-Louis de Prémare, and David Powers. The skeptics, the larger group of the two, neither accept the traditional account nor the revisionist ones, being "equally unconvinced by traditional and revisionist narratives". However, Sadeghi and Goudarzi calls them de facto revisionist because of their "attitude toward the literary sources".

Neo-traditionalists constitute the minority among scholars in the Western academia. They agree with important elements of the traditional account. Although they don't accept every report conveyed in the later sources, they do think that a critical and in-depth examination of the literary evidence supports the traditional account. Some well known members of this group include Michael Cook, Muḥammad Muḥaysin, and Harald Motzki, with the first being a revisionist defector. Neo traditionalists "have their counterparts in the Muslim world".

Journals 
 Journal of Qur'anic Studies (Edinburgh)
 QURANICA – International Journal of Quranic Research
 JIQSA-Journal of the International Qur’anic Studies Association

Major books 
 Brill's Encyclopaedia of the Qurʾān
 Center for Islamic Science's Integrated Encyclopedia of the Qurʾān (IEQ)
 The Qur'anic Studies Series, published by the Oxford University Press

See also 
 Islamic studies

References

Sources